The Bear River is a  tributary of Long Lake in the U.S. state of Maine. It originates at the outlet of Bear Pond in the town of Waterford in Oxford County, then flows southeast into the town of Bridgton in Cumberland County and finally the town of Harrison, where it reaches Long Lake.  Via Long Lake, the Songo River, and Sebago Lake, the Bear River is part of the Presumpscot River watershed, flowing to Casco Bay on the Atlantic Ocean.

See also
List of rivers of Maine

References

Maine Streamflow Data from the USGS
Maine Watershed Data From Environmental Protection Agency

Rivers of Oxford County, Maine
Rivers of Cumberland County, Maine
Bridgton, Maine
Harrison, Maine